Carlton Highdale is a civil parish in Coverdale, in the Richmondshire district of North Yorkshire, England.  According to the 2001 census it had a population of 95.

The parish covers the uppermost part of the dale, and is drained by the River Cover.  Hamlets in the parish are Woodale, Braidley, Horsehouse, Gammersgill and Swineside.

The parish was historically part of the manor of Carlton in the large parish of Coverham.  At some time the manor was divided into two manors (and townships), Carlton Town (the village of Carlton) and Carlton Highdale (the remaining part).  In 1866 the township became a separate civil parish.

References

External links

Civil parishes in North Yorkshire
Coverdale (dale)